Staroturayevo (İśke Turay) is a rural locality (a selo) and the administrative centre of Staroturayevsky Selsoviet, Yermekeyevsky District, Bashkortostan, Russia. The population was 771 as of 2010. There are 12 streets.

Geography 
Staroturayevo is located 31 km north of Yermekeyevo (the district's administrative centre) by road. Usman-Tashly is the nearest rural locality.

References 

Rural localities in Yermekeyevsky District